Prince Frederick Victor Duleep Singh, MVO, TD, FSA (23 January 1868 – 15 August 1926), also known as Prince Freddy, was a younger son of Sir Duleep Singh, the last Maharaja of the Sikh Empire.

Early life

Prince Frederick was born in London as the second or third son of Sir Duleep Singh and Bamba Müller, the former Maharaja and Maharani Duleep of Lahore. 

He was educated at Eton and Magdalene College, Cambridge where he read History (B.A. 1890; M.A. 1894). At Cambridge, he was a member of the Pitt Club. 

He was deeply interested in archaeology, contributing articles to various periodicals and became a Fellow of the Society of Antiquaries. He wrote Portraits in Norfolk Houses (1929, two volumes) alongside Rev. Edmund Farrer, and with Farrer and his friend Charles Partridge compiled and published Portraits in Suffolk Houses. He was East Anglia representative of the Society for the Protection of Ancient Buildings and reported on about 50 historic building cases for it.

Career
He lived at Old Buckenham Hall and for 20 years, at Blo' Norton Hall near Thetford. He was a staunch monarchist, possibly due to his father's good relationship with Queen Victoria, even hanging a portrait of republican Oliver Cromwell upside-down in his lavatory at Blo' Norton. His collection of Jacobite and Stuart relics (and the Cromwell painting) were presented to Inverness Museum. He gave to the town of Thetford the timber-framed Ancient House (now a museum) together with his collection of portraits.

Military
Prince Frederick served with Yeomanry regiments from 1893 to 1919.

 Appointed Second Lieutenant: – Suffolk Imperial Yeomanry – 12 August 1893.
 Promoted Lieutenant: 21 July 1894.
 Promoted Captain: 19 August 1898.

In July 1901, Prince Frederick transferred to the Norfolk Yeomanry from the Suffolk Yeomanry and was promoted to the rank of major. He resigned his commission in 1909 but rejoined the Norfolk Yeomanry in 1914 at the outbreak of World War I and was on active service in France for two years and with the General Staff.

Honours

Punjabi
  House of Punjab: Sovereign Knight Grand Cross of the Order of the Propitious Star of Punjab
  House of Punjab: Sovereign Knight Grand Cross of the Order of Ranjit Singh

British
 : Member of the Royal Victorian Order, 1901
 : Recipient of the Territorial Medal
 : Recipient of the 1914 Star Medal
 : Recipient of the Victory Medal
 : Recipient of the King Edward VII Coronation Medal
 : Recipient of the King George V Coronation Medal

Ancestry

References

External links
 Duleep Singh.com
 Genealogy of Lahore (Princely State) Queensland University

1868 births
1926 deaths
Military personnel from London
Burials in Norfolk
People from Breckland District
People educated at Eton College
Alumni of Magdalene College, Cambridge
English Sikhs
20th-century Indian royalty
Norfolk Yeomanry officers
Suffolk Yeomanry officers
People of the Sikh Empire
English people of Indian descent
English people of German descent
Indian people of German descent
Members of the Royal Victorian Order
British Army personnel of World War I